Rowshanabsar may refer to:
 Rowshanabsar-e Bala
 Rowshanabsar-e Pain